My Leopold is a 1931 German comedy film directed by Hans Steinhoff and starring Max Adalbert, Harald Paulsen and Camilla Spira. It is based on Adolphe L'Arronge's 1873 play My Leopold which had previously been adapted into silent films on three occasions.

The film's sets were designed by the art director Franz Schroedter.

Cast

References

Bibliography

External links 
 

1931 films
Films of the Weimar Republic
German comedy films
1931 comedy films
1930s German-language films
German films based on plays
Films directed by Hans Steinhoff
German black-and-white films
1930s German films